To the Metal! is the tenth full-length studio album by Gamma Ray. It was released on 29 January 2010. To promote the album, the band did a tour with Freedom Call and Secret Sphere. The album was recorded in Kai's own studio in Hamburg in autumn 2009. The band has recorded 12 songs. Ten of them were featured on the regular album release, while the other two were bonus tracks appearing on the different editions of the album. The band described some of the songs on the official website, revealing that there would be a full-throttle number called "Rise", a rhythmic and melodically diverse song called "Time To Live", and a multilayered anthem titled "All you need to know", featuring ex-Helloween frontman Michael Kiske. Other songs mentioned are "No Need to Cry", a song written by Dirk Schlächter about the death of his father, "To The Metal", a song they played on various festivals before the album release and the atmospheric and dense "Empathy". It is the last album featuring drummer Dan Zimmermann.

Track listing

Album versions
 Regular jewel case CD
 Limited edition featuring an additional DVD (including the making-of)
 Red vinyl in gatefold packaging
 Collectors' edition featuring CD and 7" vinyl with 2 bonus tracks, completely hand-signed

Critical reception

The critical reception to this album has been mostly positive, with some critics praising the musicianship and the drumming in particular. [] Others have praised the band for their consistency and for remaining 'one of heavy metal's most unsung heroes'.

Personnel
 Kai Hansen - lead vocals, guitar
 Henjo Richter - guitar, keyboards
 Dirk Schlächter - bass, lead vocals (10)
 Dan Zimmermann - drums

Guest musician
 Michael Kiske - lead vocals (2)

Technical personnel 
 Dirk Schlächter, Kai Hansen — production and engineering
 Hervé Monjeaud — cover painting

Charts

References

2010 albums
Gamma Ray (band) albums
Edel AG albums
Albums produced by Kai Hansen